CWIS may refer to:

 Center for World Indigenous Studies, a non-profit organization that studies indigenous peoples.
 Campus-Wide Information System, an Internet-based information system provided by an educational institution.
 Christian Women in Science,  an affiliate group of the American Scientific Affiliation (ASA)
 Close-in weapon system, a naval point defense weapon system
 Countrywide Immigration Services, a New Zealand immigration consultancy business.
 Cycling & Walking Investment Strategy, a UK Government Department for Transport initiative.